Earl is a title of nobility.

Earl may also refer to:

Places
 Earl, Colorado
 Earl, Missouri
 Earl, North Carolina
 Earl, Wisconsin
 Edinburgh Airport Rail Link (EARL)

People
 Earl (given name) 
 Earl (surname)
 Earl (singer), American singer-songwriter
 Earl (recording artist), American recording artist

Entertainment
 Earl, a fictional planet in My-Otome
 Earl, nickname of a car on MythBusters
 Earl Schmerle, an animatronic puppet used by Rolfe DeWolfe, in The Rock-afire Explosion music show
 Earl (mixtape), a mixtape by Earl Sweatshirt

Other uses 
 Earl (automobile), an automobile manufactured by Earl Motors Incorporated
 Earls (restaurant chain)
 The EARL, music venue in Atlanta, United States

See also
 Earl Township (disambiguation)
 Eorl (disambiguation)
 Hurricane Earl (disambiguation)